The final of the men's 1500 metres freestyle event at the 1998 World Aquatics Championships was held on Sunday 18 January in Perth, Western Australia.

Finals

Qualifying heats
Held on Saturday 17 January 1998

See also
1996 Men's Olympic Games 1,500m Freestyle (Atlanta)
1997 Men's World SC Championships 1,500m Freestyle (Gothenburg)
1997 Men's European LC Championships 1,500m Freestyle (Seville)
2000 Men's Olympic Games 1,500m Freestyle (Sydney)

References

Swimming at the 1998 World Aquatics Championships